Elizabeth Barbara Bulwer-Lytton (née Warburton-Lytton; 1 May 1770 – 19 December 1843) was a member of the Lytton family of Knebworth House in Hertfordshire, England.

Life
Her parents were Richard Warburton-Lytton (1745–1810) and Elizabeth Jodrell. In 1798, she married General William Earle Bulwer (1757–1807), and the couple lived at Heydon Hall in Norfolk. Their first son, William Earle Lytton Bulwer, was born the year after their marriage. A second son, Henry, was born in 1801, followed by Edward in 1803.

After her father's death, Elizabeth Bulwer resumed her father's surname, by a royal licence of 1811. That year she returned to Knebworth House, which by then had become dilapidated. She renovated it by demolishing three of its four sides and adding Gothic towers and battlements to the remaining building. This Tudor Gothic work was carried out in 1813 by John Biagio Rebecca.

She lived at Knebworth with her son, the writer Edward Bulwer-Lytton, until her death.  Because of a long-standing dispute she had with the church, she is buried not with her ancestors at St Mary's Knebworth, but in the Lytton Mausoleum nearby which she commissioned from John Buonarotti Papworth in 1817.

Elizabeth's death greatly affected her son, as described in a letter originally published in 1845, and again in a posthumous 1875 collection.  As to his mother, in her room, Bulwer-Lytton "had inscribed above the mantlepiece a request that future generations preserve the room as his beloved mother had used it", and which remains essentially unchanged to this day.

References

External links 
 "Turbans, Tea and Talk of Books:  the Literary Parties of Elizabeth Spence and Elizabeth Benger", Corvey Women Writers on the Web

1770 births
1843 deaths
Burials at the Lytton Mausoleum
Women of the Victorian era
Elizabeth
18th-century English women
18th-century English people
19th-century English women
19th-century English people